Wharton, Inc. was an early silent film production company in Ithaca, New York, from 1914 to 1919. The Ithaca movie studio was established by brothers Theodore and Leopold Wharton on the shores of Cayuga Lake at the site of what is now Stewart Park. Currently, efforts are underway to create a silent movie museum in the former Wharton movie studio building in Stewart Park.

Ithaca (1912 - 1920) 
After filming a Cornell-Penn football game on the way to visit family in Ludlowville, New York, Theodore Wharton returned to Ithaca in 1913 with a cast and crew that included Francis X. Bushman and Beverly Bayne. 

A year later, his older brother Leopold joined him, and the two set up the Wharton Studio and began making films. The Wharton brothers were responsible for bringing many famous movie stars to Ithaca on the overnight train from New York City, making Ithaca the unofficial capital of the silent film industry. The movies were shot within elaborate studio sets and in natural sites around Ithaca, including the gorges on the Cornell University campus and in the woods near Beebe Lake.

Santa Cruz (1926 - 1931) 
In the early 1920s, the Wharton studio moved from Ithaca to Santa Cruz, California, in response to promotion by Santa Cruz mayor Fred Swanton. By then, the majority of the film industry had settled in Southern California and Hollywood because of the ability to shoot year-round. The studio was incorporated as Wharton Film Classics, Inc. Leopold died in 1927 and Theodore in 1931, without ever making a movie in the city. Much of the evidence of the brothers' prolific cinematic career was lost in 1929 when hundreds of nitrate-based film reels belonging to the Wharton Brothers spontaneously combusted in the storage shed at the home of their lawyer.

Films produced at Ithaca Studios 
 The Crooked Dagger (1919)
 The Red Peril (1919)
 A Romance of the Air (1918)
 April Fool (1918)
 The Eagle's Eye (1918)
 Mission of the War Chest (1918)
 The Candidate (1918)
 The Missionary (1918)
 Below Zero (1917)
 The Great White Trail (1917)
 The Black Stork (1917)
 Patria (1917)
 The Crusher (1917)
 Beatrice Fairfax (1916)
 The Lottery Man (1916)
 The Mysteries of Myra (1916)
 Hazel Kirke (1916)
 The City (1916)
 The New Adventures of J. Rufus Wallingford (1915)
 The Romance of Elaine (1915)
 The New Exploits of Elaine (1915)
 The Stolen Birthright (1914)
 The Exploits of Elaine (1914)
 The Fireman and the Girl (1914)
 A Prince of India (1914)
 The Pawn of Fortune (1914)
 The Warning (1914)
 The Boundary Rider (1914)

References

External links 
 List of films made at the Wharton Studio at IMDB
 
 "Silent Film Industry Blossoms in Ithaca," Cornell Daily Sun. Available online.
 Ithaca Made Movies
 Ithaca Silent Movies

Ithaca, New York
Whartons, The
1914 establishments in New York (state)
Mass media companies established in 1914
Mass media companies disestablished in 1931
Film production companies of the United States
1931 disestablishments in California